The Portuguese Communist Youth ( or ) is the youth organization of the Portuguese Communist Party, and was founded on 10 November 1979, after the unification of the Young Communist League and the Communist Students League.

The JCP has a political relationship with the Portuguese Communist Party; however, it is an independent organization. The headquarters of the JCP are located in Lisbon.

The JCP is a member of the World Federation of Democratic Youth (WFDY), a non-governmental youth organization that congregates several left-wing youth organizations from all continents. The WFDY holds an international event, named the World Festival of Youth and Students, in which the Portuguese Communist Youth participates. JCP has held the presidency of the World Federation of Democratic Youth in the past and maintains an active role in the Federation.

Composed of students and working-class youth, the JCP's main political concerns and interventions are on the subject of the promotion of a free and public education in all degrees, employment, access to sports and culture, peace, and housing.

JCP also promotes international brigades for countries like Cuba, Palestine, and Venezuela, both alone and with other European communist youth organizations like KNE and SDAJ.

Structure

The main organ of the JCP is the congress, a political convention that is held each three years. In the congress, the organization defines its political strategies and elects a new National Committee.

Between the congresses, the main organ is the National Committee, which assures that the political guidelines are being implemented, schedules and carries out the national activities of the JCP, manages the property and funds, and also assures the JCP's international relations.

Each member of the JCP belongs to a local group, in his or her school, town, or work place. These groups belong to a regional organization, usually at district level. The regional organization holds regional activities, and is managed by a regional committee.

In a different level, the JCP divides its work and structure in three main sector level organizations: the organization of the intermediate and high school students, the organization of the university and college students, and a last one to the young working people. Each of these co-ordinates the work and the activities related to each corresponding sector.

See also
Portugal
Politics of Portugal
Portuguese Communist Party
Communism
Marxism–Leninism

References

External links
JCP Official website 

Youth wings of communist parties
Youth wings of political parties in Portugal
Portuguese Communist Party